The Samsung Galaxy Camera 2 is a point-and-shoot camera which is an Android based mobile device. Announced at the 2014 Consumer Electronic Show in Las Vegas, Nevada, the Galaxy Camera 2 features Android 4.3 Jelly Bean, 1.6 GHz quad-core Exynos 4412 processor and 2GB RAM. The Galaxy Camera 2 is the successor to the Samsung Galaxy Camera. Unlike its predecessor, it has a GPS receiver.

References

Galaxy Camera 2
Android cameras with optical zoom
Point-and-shoot cameras
Cameras introduced in 2014
Mobile phones with mechanical zoom lens